Elachista laetella is a moth of the family Elachistidae that is endemic to Bulgaria.

References

laetella
Moths described in 1930
Moths of Europe